The Quenonisca Lake is a freshwater body of the municipality of Eeyou Istchee Baie-James (Municipality), in the administrative region of Nord-du-Québec, Quebec, Canada. The
northern part of the lake is crossed to the West by the Broadback River.

Forestry is the main economic activity of the sector. Recreational tourism activities come second with an upstream navigable water body including the Broadback River and the Nipukatasi River.

The southern portion of the Quenonisca Lake hydrographic slope is accessible via a forest road (east-west direction) from the west, connecting the road going North.

The surface of Quénonisca Lake is usually frozen from early November to mid-May, however, safe ice circulation is generally from mid-November to mid-April.

Geography 
Quénonisca Lake is part of a group of lakes in the same area, which are formed in length, more or less parallel to each other, including the Salamander Lake (west side), the Rocher Lake (East side) crossed by the Nipukatasi River and Amisquioumisca Lake (East side).

Lake Quenonisca is mainly fed by the outlet of Lake Opataouaga, coming from the South and discharging at the bottom of a bay on the South-East shore; and
by the dump of La Peupleraie lake pouring on the North-West shore. In addition, the Broadback River crosses the northern part of Quenonisca Lake to the west.

Quenonisca Lake is made up of 49 islands, one  at its mouth and another
 in length near the southern part of Salamander Lake (lake neighbor on
the northwest side).

Areas around the lake have a generally level topography, except for:
South side, where there are several mountains.

Geology

This convert was originally described as the "Rock-Kenonisca Massif" by Franconi (1974) in his report on the mapping of the western half of the Frotet-Evans volcano-sedimentary band. It was renamed "Rocher-Quénonisca Intrusive Suite" by Brisson (1998) when mapping the Lac Rocher region (NTS sheet 32K09). The addition of the Whitefish Intrusion (nAwf) and the Rock Intrusion (nAlrc) as lithodemes in the Rocher-Quénonisca Intrusive Suite is proposed as a result of Leclerc and Caron-Côté field work and compilation. (2017).

Toponymy
Of Cree origin (Eastern Cree, Northern dialect), this hydronym means "the long lake".

The toponym Lac Quénonisca was formalized on December 5, 1968 at the Commission de toponymie du Québec, at the creation of this commission.

Notes and references

See also 
Broadback River
Evans Lake
Eeyou Istchee James Bay (municipality)
List of lakes in Canada

Eeyou Istchee James Bay
Broadback River drainage basin
Quenonisca
Jamésie